Dziadowice  is a village in the administrative district of Gmina Malanów, within Turek County, Greater Poland Voivodeship, in west-central Poland.

The village has a population of 494.

References

Dziadowice